The 2016 NCAA Division I Women's Swimming and Diving Championships were contested March 16–19, 2016 at the 35th annual NCAA-sanctioned swim meet to determine the team and individual national champions of Division I women's collegiate swimming and diving in the United States.

This year's events were hosted by the Georgia Institute of Technology at the McAuley Aquatic Center in Atlanta, Georgia.

Georgia once again returned to the top of the team standings, finishing 19 points (414–395) ahead of Stanford. This was the Lady Bulldogs' seventh team title.

Lilly King of Indiana was awarded the 2016 CSCAA (College Swimming Coaches Association of America) Swimmer of the Year. King won the 100 and 200 breaststrokes in record breaking fashion, and was the first woman under 57 seconds in the 100 breast, and the first women to go under the 2:04 barrier in the 200 breaststroke. She helped the Hoosiers in the medley relay with monster splits of 56.74 and 26.05 to help Indiana to a 7th-place finish.

Georgia's Jack Bauerle was awarded the 2016 CSCAA Division 1 Women's Coach of the Year after leading the Lady Dawgs to a win over the favored Stanford Cardinal, and helped Olivia Smoliga and Brittany MacLean win individual titles.

Team standings
Note: Top 10 only
(DC) = Defending champions
Italics = Debut finish in the Top 10
Full results

Swimming results

Diving Results

See also
List of college swimming and diving teams

References

NCAA Division I Swimming And Diving Championships
NCAA Division I Swimming And Diving Championships
NCAA Division I Women's Swimming and Diving Championships